The 1942-43 Bohemian-Moravian Hockey League season was the fourth season of the Bohemian-Moravian Hockey League. Six teams participated in the league, and LTC Prag won the championship.

Regular season

Promotion

Semifinals:
 AFK Kolín – Královo Pole 1:1 OT
 SK Libeň – Stadion Prag 2:1

Final:
 SK Libeň – AFK Kolín 5:2

SK Liben was promoted to the Bohemian-Moravian League for 1943–44.

External links
 Season on hockeyarchives.info

Bohemian-Moravian Hockey League seasons
Boh